The Lord Mayor of Nottingham is a largely ceremonial role for the city of Nottingham, England.

The position was historically Mayor of Nottingham; this was changed to Lord Mayor in 1928. The position is elected every May by Nottingham city councillors at their annual council meeting.

History

The post of Mayor of Nottingham was created in the Charter of Edward I approved on 12 February 1284.

The title was changed to Lord Mayor of Nottingham by Letters Patent, announced by King George V on 10 July 1928, at the opening of the new University College at Highfields.  The first holder of the title was the Mayor for the current year, Alderman Edmund Huntsman.

Contrary to popular belief, the Mayoral status was unaffected when Nottingham achieved city status during the Diamond Jubilee of Queen Victoria in June 1897. The bestowing of City status is normally a separate issue to the rank of the Mayor concerned.  In fact, there is only one case of a Borough being given City status and its Mayor being elevated to Lord Mayor at the same time – this occurred with Cardiff in 1905. It has recently (i.e. since 2002) become the established rule that newly created cities should wait for an interval of at least 10 years before making an application for a Lord Mayoralty.

After City status had been awarded, Nottingham applied (unsuccessfully) for a Lord Mayor in 1911 (marking the Coronation of King George V), and to mark Royal visits in both 1914 and 1919.

Historically, the Mayor of Nottingham was elected in a ceremony in St. Mary's Church, Nottingham. Although the election no longer happens in the church, a civic service is held there each year to mark the Lord Mayor's appointment.

Role

Some of the duties of the Lord Mayor include being a champion of the city and attending official events. The role also includes supporting up to 3 charities and presenting the Lord Mayor's Awards for Urban Design.

Mayors of the Borough of Nottingham (1284–1897)
Source: Nottingham City Council

13th century

1284/85 Roger de Crophill
1285/86 Hugh le Fleming .
1286/87 John le Fleming
1287/88 No known name
1288/89 No known name
1289/90 No known name
1290/91 Roger de Crophill
1291/92 No known name
1292/93 Michael Aurifaber
1293/94 No known name
1294/95 Ralph de Ufton
1295/96 Adam le Palmer
1296/97 No known name
1297/98 Michael Aurifaber
1298/99 No known name
1299/1300 William de Normanton

14th century

1300/01 John le Fleming
1301/02 Richard le Cupper
1302/03 John le Palmer
1303/04 John le Palmer
1304/05 John le Bere
1305/06 Adam le Fleming
1306/07 John le Palmer
1307/08 John Kytte
1308/09 John Kytte
1309/10 John Kytte
1310/11 Walter de Thornton
1311/12 John le Palmer
1312/13 Walter de Thorneton
1313/14 Peter de Morwood
1314/15 Robert Ingram
1315/16 Robert Ingram
1316/17 William de Mekisburg
1317/18 Robert le Crophill
1318/19 Walter de Lincoln
1319/20 No known name
1320/21 Robert Ingram
1321/22 Robert de Crophill
1322/23 Robert Ingram
1327/28 John Brian
1328/29 William de Amyas
1329/30 Ralph le Tavener
1330/31 Nicholas de Shelford
1331/32 Laurence le Spicer
1332/33 Henry de Cesterfield
1333/34 William de Amyas
1334/35 Roger de Botchal
1335/36 Laurence le Spicer
1336/37 Robert de Crophill
1337/38 Henry de Cesterfield
1338/39 Henry de Cesterfield
1339/40 John le Colyer
1340/41 Ralph de Wolaton
1341/42 Roger de Botchal
1342/43 No known name
1343/44 No known name
1344/45 John de Tunby
1345/46 John de Tunby
1346/47 Thomas de Edwalton
1347/48 Robert de Morwood
1348/49 Nicholas de Crophill
1349/50 No known name
1350/51 No known name
1351/52 Richard de Lyndby
1352/53 John Bridgford
1353/54 Walter de Walton
1354/55 Simon Bertevill
1355/56 Richard Salmon
1356/57 John de Thornton
1357/58 Walter de Walton
1358/59 No known name
1359/60 Hugh le Spicer
1360/61 Nicholas de Crophill
1361/62 John Samon
1362/63 Roger de Hopwell
1363/64 Ralph de Tollerton
1364/65 Roger de Hopwell
1365/66 John Samon
1370/71 John Samon
1371/72 No known name
1372/73 Roger de Holm
1373/74 Roger Masson
1374/75 Ralph Torkard
1375/76 John Samon
1376/77 No known name
1377/78 Roger Masson
1378/79 John Samon
1379/80 John de Plumptre
1380/81 William de Thrumpton
1381/82 Ralph Plot
1382/83 John de Crowshawe
1383/84 John Samon
1384/85 Richard Hanneson John Samon
1385/86 John de Plumptre
1386/87 Richard ate Chanons
1387/88 Henry de Plumptre
1388/89 John de Crawshawe
1389/90 John de Crawshawe
1390/91 Robert Squire
1391/92 John de Plumptre
1392/93 Henry de Normanton
1393/94 William Huntston
1394/95 John de Plumptre
1395/96 John de Plumptre
1396/97 John Samon
1397/98 No known name
1398/99 Henry de Wilford
1399/1400 John de Tannesley

15th century

1400/01 Hugh de Lyndby
1401/02 Robert Squire
1402/03 Thomas de Mapperley
1403/04 Thomas de Stanley
1404/05 Robert Glade
1405/06 Thomas Kay
1406/07 Thomas Fox
1407/08 John Samon
1408/09 John de Plumptre
1409/10 John de Alastre
1410/11 John de Tannesley
1411/12 John de Heath
1412/13 Henry de Wilford
1413/14 Robert Glade
1415/16 Thomas Kay
1416/17 William Stokes
1417/18 Richard Tavener
1418/19 Richard Samon
1419/20 Robert Glade
1420/21 John Alastre
1421/22 Thomas Page
1422/23 Richard Salmon
1423/24 Robert Glade
1424/25 No known name
1425/26 William Stokes
1426/27 John Alastre
1427/28 John Plumptre
1428/29 Richard Samon
1429/30 William Brodholm
1430/31 John Alastre
1431/32 William Halifax
1432/33 Richaed Samon
1433/34 John Etwell
1434/35 William Brodholm
1435/36 John Orgrave
1436/37 Thomas Alastre
1437/38 John Plumptre
1438/39 William Webster
1439/40 Richard Samon
1440/41 William Halifax
1441/42 John Orgrave
1442/43 Thomas Thurland
1443/44 Robert Raysyn
1444/45 Thomas Alastre
1445/46 John Plumptre
1446/47 Geoffrey Knyveton
1447/48 Thomas Thurland
1448/49 Thomas Thurland
1449/50 John Orgrave
1450/51 Thomas Thurland
1451/52 Richard Samon
1452/53 Thomas Alastre
1453/54 Thomas Thurland
1454/55 John Plumptre
1455/56 John Squire
1456/57 John Orgrave
1457/58 Richard Wood
1458/59 Thomas Thurland
1459/60 Thomas Thurland
1460/61 John Hunt
1461/62 Thomas Alestre
1462/63 Thomas Thurland
1460/61 John Hunt
1461/62 Thomas Alestre
1462/63 Thomas Thurland
1463/64 Thomas Thurland
1464/65 John Squyer
1465/66 Richard Wood
1466/67 Robert Stable
1467/68 John Hunt
1468/69 John Squire
1469/70 Thomas Alastre
1470/71 Robert English
1471/72 Thomas Lokton
1472/73 Roger Hudson
1473/74 John Mapperley
1474/75 John Hunt
1475/76 John Hunt
1476/77 John Clerk
1477/78 Robert English
1478/79 John Paynter
1479/80 Edmund Hunt
1480/81 William Hegyn
1481/82 John Mapperley
1482/83 John Hunt
1483/84 John Clerk
1484/85 Thomas Thurland
1485/86 Richard Alastre
1486/87 William Hegyn
1487/88 Richard Ody
1488/89 Thomas Warner
1489/90 Walter Hylton
1490/91 Thomas Thurland
1491/92 John Clerk
1492/93 John Wedurley
1493/94 Robert Hegyn
1494/95 Richard Ody
1495/96 Thomas Warner
1496/97 Walter Hylton
1497/98 John Selyok
1498/99 John Selyok
1499/1500 Richard Mellours

16th century

1500/01 William Hegyn
1501/02 John Cost
1502/03 Thomas Warner
1503/04 John Wedurley
1504/05 John Howit
1505/06 John Selyok
1506/07 Richard Mellours
1507/08 Richard Pykard
1508/09 John Cost
1509/10 John Williamson
1510/11 John Williamson
1511/12 John Howet
1512/13 Thomas Alastre
1513/14 John Roose
1514/15 John Cost
1515/16 Thomas Mellours
1516/17 Richard Rydgeley
1517/18 John Wilkinson
1518/19 Thomas Willughby
1519/20 William English
1520/21 John Roose
1521/22 Robert Mellours
1522/23 Robert Mellours
1523/24 William Kyrkby
1524/25 John Williamson
1525/26 Robert Hessylryge
1526/27 John Roose
1527/28 William Parmatour
1528/29 John Howes
1529/30 Thomas Mellours
1530/31 Costin (Constantine) Pyckard
1531/32 Thomas Hobbes
1532/33 Thomas Hessylryge
1533/34 John Dowbleday
1534/35 William Parmatour
1535/36 John Howes
1536/37 John Yates
1537/38 Edward Chamberleyn
1538/39 Thomas Hobbes
1539/40 Robert Hessylryge
1540/41 John Alenson Robert Lovatt
1541/42 Robert Lovatt
1542/43 Humphrey Querneby
1543/44 Richard Willughbye
1544/45 Edward Chamberleyn
1545/46 Thomas Coughen
1546/47 William Atkinson
1547/48 Thomas Dawson
1548/49 Robert Lovatt
1549/50 Humphrey Querneby
1550/51 Edward Chamberleyn
1551/52 Thomas Coughen
1552/53 John Colinson
1553/54 Robert Hesilrig
1554/55 Robert Hesilrig
1557/58 John Heskey William Atkynson
1558/59 Thomas Cockeyn
1559/60 Nicholas Bonner
1560/61 Henry Fossebrook
1561/62 John Gregory
1562/63 Humphrey Quarneby
1563/64 John Collinson
1564/65 Thomas Cockeyn
1565/66 Nicholas Bonner
1566/67 Henry Fossebrook
1567/68 John Brownlow
1568/69 John Brownlow
1569/70 Henry Newton
1570/71 Richard James
1571/72 John Gregory
1572/73 Robert Standley
1573/74 Robert Alvey
1574/75 Robert Burton
1575/76 John Brownlow
1576/77 Henry Newton
1577/78 Richard James
1578/79 William Scott
1579/80 John Gregory
1580/81 Robert Alvey
1581/82 Robert Burton
1582/83 John Brownlow
1583/84 William Gellestrope
1584/85 Peter Clark
1585/86 William Scott
1586/87 John Gregory
1587/88 Robert Alvey
1588/89 Robert Marsh
1589/90 John Brownlow
1590/91 William Gellestrope
1591/92 Peter Clark
1592/93 William Scott
1593/94 Humphrey Bonner
1594/95 Robert Alvey
1595/96 Richard Hurt
1596/97 Richard Morehage
1597/98 Peter Clark
1598/99 Anker Jackson
1599/1600 William Freeman

17th century

1600/01 Humphrey Bonner
1601/02 Robert Staples
1602/03 Richard Hurt
1603/04 Richard Morehaghe
1604/05 Richard Welch
1605/06 Anker Jackson
1606/07 William Freeman
1607/08 Humphrey Bonner
1608/09 Robert Staples
1609/10 Richard Hurt
1610/11 Richard Morehage
1611/12 Richard Welch
1612/13 Anker Jackson
1613/14 William Freeman
1614/15 Richard Parker
1615/16 Robert Staples
1616/17 Thomas Nix
1617/18 Leonard Nix
1618/19 Stephen Hill
1619/20 Anker Jackson
1620/21 Marmaduke Gregory
1621/22 Richard Parker
1622/23 Robert Staple
1623/24 Robert Sherwin
1624/25 Leonard Nix
1625/26 Stephen Hill
1626/27 Robert Parker
1627/28 John James
1628/29 Richard Parker
1629/30 Alexander Staples
1630/31 Robert Sherwin
1631/32 Leonard Nix
1632/33 William Gregory
1633/34 Robert Parker
1634/35 John James
1635/36 Richard Hardmeat
1636/37 William Nix
1637/38 Robert Sherwin
1638/39 Robert Burton
1639/40 William Gregory
1640/41 William Drury
1641/42 John James
1642/43 Richard Hardmeat
1643/44 William Nix
1644/45 William Nix
1645/46 Thomas Gamble
1646/47 John James
1647/48 William Drury
1648/49 William Richards
1649/50 William Nix
1650/51 Thomas Gamble
1651/52 Richard Dring
1652/53 William Drury
1653/54 Francis Toplady
1654/55 John Parker
1655/56 Thomas Huthwaite
1656/57 William Richards
1657/58 Thomas Gamble
1658/59 Richard Dring John Fillingham
1659/60 William Drury
1660/61 Francis Toplady
1661/62 John Parker
1662/63 John Toplady
1663/64 William Greaves
1664/65 Ralph Edge
1665/66 William Jackson
1666/67 Richard Hodgkin
1667/68 Joseph Wright
1668/69 John Parker
1669/70 Christopher Hall
1670/71 William Greaves
1671/72 Ralph Edge
1672/73 William Jackson
1673/74 Richard Hodgkin
1674/75 Joseph Wright Samuel Watkinson
1675/76 John Parker
1676/77 Christopher Hall
1677/78 William Greaves
1678/79 Ralph Edge
1679/80 John Parker Jnr.
1680/81 Gervas Rippon
1681/82 Gervas Wylde
1682/83 William Toplady
1683/84 Christopher Hall
1684/85 William Petty
1685/86 Robert Wortley
1686/87 John Parker
1687/88 Gervas Rippon John Sherwin George Langford
1688/89 George Langford
1689/90 Charles Harvey
1690/91 John Hawkins
1691/92 Joseph Turpin
1692/93 William Greaves
1693/94 Thomas Trigge
1696/97 Francis Salmon
1697/98 Samuel Lealand
1698/99 William Greaves
1699/1700 Thomas Collin

18th century

1700/01 Samuel Watkinson
1701/02 John Rickards
1702/03 John Peake
1703/04 Samuel Smith
1704/05 William Barke
1705/06 John Shipman
1706/07 Francis Salmon
1707/08 William Drury
1708/09 Samuel Watkinson
1709/10 John Peake
1710/11 Samuel Smith
1711/12 Benjamin Green
1712/13 William Barke
1713/14 John Collin
1714/15 John Shipman
1715/16 Thomas Hawkesley / Samuel Watkinson
1716/17 John Sherwin
1717/18 Thomas Trigge
1718/19 Marmaduke Pennel
1719/20 Richard Bearn
1720/21 William Bilbie
1721/22 Benjamin Green
1722/23 Alexander Burden
1723/24 Thomas Trigge
1724/25 Marmaduke Pennel
1725/26 Richard Bearn
1726/27 William Bilbie
1727/28 Joseph Walters
1728/29 Benjamin Green
1729/30 Alexander Burden
1730/31 William Trigge
1731/32 Thomas Trigge
1732/33 John Huthwaite
1733/34 Thomas Langford
1734/35 William Bilbie
1735/36 Benjamin Green
1736/37 Alexander Burden
1737/38 William Trigge
1738/39 John Newton
1739/40 James Huthwaite
1740/41 Thomas Langford
1741/42 Alexander Burden
1742/43 William Trigge
1743/44 John Hornbuckle
1744/45 John Burton
1745/46 Henry Butler
1746/47 James Huthwaite
1747/48 Thomas Langford
1748/49 William Trigge
1749/50 John Hornbuckle
1750/51 John Burton
1751/52 Henry Butler
1752/53 James Huthwaite
1753/54 Thomas Langford
1754/55 John Hornbuckle
1755/56 Samuel Fellows
1756/57 John Burton
1757/58 Cornelius Huthwaite
1758/59 Henry Butler
1759/60 Isaac Wylde / Thomas Langford
1760/61 Robert Huish
1761/62 James Hornbuckle
1762/63 Humphrey Hollins
1763/64 Cornelius Huthwaite
1764/65 Henry Butler
1765/66 William Cooper
1766/67 Robie Swann
1767/68 James Hornbuckle
1768/69 William Foulds
1769/70 Humphrey Hollins
1770/71 Richard Butler
1771/72 Cornelius Huthwaite
1772/73 Henry Butler / Richard Butler
1773/74 Thomas Oldknow
1774/75 John Caruthers
1775/76 John Fellows
1776/77 Thomas Sands
1777/78 Richard Butler
1778/79 Thomas Oldknow
1779/80 William Huthwaite
1780/81 John Smellie
1781/82 John Caruthers
1782/83 John Fellows
1783/84 Richard Butler
1784/85 William Howitt
1785/86 William Huthwaite
1786/87 John Caruthers
1787/88 Joseph Lowe
1788/89 William Smith
1789/90 Richard Butler
1790/91 John Fellows
1791/92 William Huthwaite
1792/93 Joseph Oldknow
1793/94 Henry Green
1794/95 Thomas Caunt
1795/96 Benjamin Hornbuckle
1796/97 William Howitt
1797/98 Joseph Lowe
1798/99 Thomas Oldknow
1799/1800 Joseph Oldknow

19th century

1800/01 Samuel Worthington
1801/02 John Davison
1802/03 Benjamin Hornbuckle
1803/04 Stokeham Huthwaite
1804/05 John Ashwell
1805/06 Edward Swann
1806/07 John Allen
1807/08 Joseph Lowe
1808/09 William Howitt
1809/10 Wright Coldham
1810/11 John Bates
1811/12 William Wilson
1812/13 Edward Swann
1813/14 John Allen
1814/15 John Ashwell
1815/16 Charles L. Morley
1816/17 William Wilson
1817/18 John H. Barber
1818/19 Isaac Woolley
1819/20 William Soars
1820/21 John Ashwell
1821/22 Charles L. Morley
1822/23 Octavius Thomas Oldknow
1823/24 William Wilson
1824/25 Samuel Deverill
1825/26 John H. Barber
1826/27 John Allen
1827/28 William Soars
1828/29 Charles l. Morley
1829/30 Octavius Thomas Oldknow
1830/31 William Wilson
1831/32 John H. Barber
1832/33 John Heard
1833/34 William Soars
1834/35 Charles L. Morley
1835/36 Thomas Wakefield
1836/37 Richard Morley
1837/38 John Heard
1838/39 John Wells
1839/40 William Roworth
1840/41 Dr. John M. B. Pigot
1841/42 Richard Morley
1842/43 Thomas Wakefield
1843/44 William Vickers
1844/45 Thomas North
1845/46 Thomas Herbert
1846/47 William Cripps
1847/48 John Heard
1848/49 Thomas Carver
1849/50 Richard Birkin
1850/51 William Felkin
1851/52 William Felkin
1852/53 Thomas Cullen
1853/54 Jonathon Reckless
1854/55 John L. Thackery
1855/56 Richard Birkin
1856/57 John Bradley
1857/58 Lewis Heyman
1858/59 Edwin Patchitt
1859/60 Edwin Patchitt
1860/61 Thomas Cullen
1861/62 Richard Birkin
1862/63 Richard Birkin
1863/64 William Parsons
1864/65 William Page
1865/66 Thomas Ball
1866/67 John L. Thackery
1867/68 John Barber
1868/69 John Barber
1869/70 James Oldknow
1870/71 John Manning
1871/72 William G. Ward
1872/73 William Foster
1873/74 John Howitt
1874/75 William Lambert
1875/76 John Manning
1876/77 John Bowers
1877/78 William G. Ward
1878/79 Sir James Oldknow
1879/80 Sir James Oldknow
1880/81 Edward Gripper
1881/82 Edward Goldschmidt
1882/83 Leonard Lindley
1883/84 John Manning
1884/85 John Burton
1885/86 William Lambert
1886/87 John Turney
1887/88 John Turney
1888/89 John Renals
1889/90 Edward Goldschmidt
1890/91 Samuel E. Sands
1891/92 Richard Fitzhugh
1892/93 Anderson Brownsword
1893/94 Frederick Pullman
1894/95 Joseph Bright
1895/96 Joseph Bright

Mayors of the City of Nottingham (1897–1928)

1896/97 Edward Henry Fraser
1897/98 Edward Henry Fraser
1898/99 Edward Henry Fraser
1899/1900 Abraham Pyatt
1900/01 Frederick R. Radford
1901/02 Edward N. Elborne (Conservative)
1902/03 Arthur W. Black
1903/04 Alfred Page
1904/05 Joseph Bright
1905/06 Arthur Cleaver
1906/07 John Alfred H. Green
1907/08 John T. Spalding
1908/09 John Ashworth
1909/10 Albert Ball
1910/11 Sir Edward Henry Fraser
1911/12 Edwin Mellor
1912/13 Thomas Ward
1913/14 Frederick Ball
1914/15 John Henry Gregg
1915/16 John C. Small
1916/17 John E. Pendleton
1917/18 John C. Small
1918/19 John E. Pendleton
1919/20 John Morris
1920/21 Herbert Bowles
1921/22 Frederick Berryman
1922/23 Edward L. Manning
1923/24 John Houston
1924/25 James Clarkson
1925/26 Charles Foulds
1926/27 John H. Freckingham
1927/28 Ald. Edmund Huntsman

Lord Mayors of Nottingham (1928–present)

19281939

1928 Edmund Huntsman
1928/29 Albert Reuben Atkey
1929/30 Walter Wessen
1930/31 Arthur Pollard
1931/32 William Green
1932/33 S. Whitby
1933/34 John Farr
1934/35 Richard E. Ashworth
1935/36 Sir Albert Ball
1936/37 E. Purser
1937/38 William Hooley
1938/39 Joseph Baldwin
1939/40 Wallace Binch

19401949

1940/41 Walter Halls
1941/42 Louis Pilsworth
1942/43 Ernest Braddock
1943/44 Frederick Mitchell
1944/45 Francis Carney
1945/46 E. O. Underwood
1946/47 Robert Shaw
1947/48 John E. Mitchell
1948/49 John E. Mitchell
1949/50 William Sharp

19501959

1950/51 Harry O. Emmony
1951/52 George H. Wigman
1952/53 Leon H. Wilson
1953/54 Christopher Coffey
1954/55 Sidney Hobson
1955/56 Leonard Mitson
1956/57 William J. Cox
1957/58 William Hickling
1958/59 Joseph Littlefair
1959/60 John W. Kenyon

19601969

1960/61 Roland E. Green
1961/62 John L. Davies
1962/63 Sidney P. Hill
1963/64 Cornelius Cameron
1964/65 Frank Wootton
1965/66 William Derbyshire
1966/67 Percy Holland
1967/68 Arthur F. Roberts
1968/69 Mrs. W.J. Case
1969/70 William George Ernest Dyer

19701979

1970/71 Oscar S. Watkinson, O.B.E.
1971/72 Dr. Ernest Want
1972/73 Charles A. Butler
1973/74 Eric S. Foster
1974/75 Stanley Shelton
1975/76 Mrs. I.F. Mathews
1976/77 Stanley J. Rushton
1977/78 Edwin E. Bateman
1978/79 Oscar S. Watkinson O.B.E.
1979/80 Dennis C. Birkinshaw

19801989

1980/81 Thomas S. Wilkins, B.E.M.
1981/82 Thomas J.Arnold
1982/83 Peter Burgess
1983/84 Arthur G. Wright
1984/85 Mrs.I.F.Matthews
1985/86 David Tongue
1986/87 Frank Higgins
1987/88 Charles A.Clarke
1988/89 Martin W. Suthers
1989/90 John Riley

19901999

1990/91 Christopher Gibson
1991/92 Alan White
1992/93 Malcolm A. Wood
1993/94 Mohammed Ibrahim
1994/95 Vernon B. Gapper
1995/96 Mrs. Sylvia Parsons
1996/97 Barrie Parker
1997/98 Roy Greensmith
1998/99 Joyce A. Donn
1999/2000 Dennis A. Jones

20002009

2000/01 Ian W. Malcolm
2001/02 Roy Greensmith
2002/03 Desmond Wilson
2003/04 Brent Charlesworth
2004/05 John Hartshorne
2005/06 Coun. Mohammed Munir
2006/07  Desmond Wilson
2007/08 Mohammed Munir
2008/09 Gul Nawaz Khan
2009/10 Jeannie Packer

2010present

2010/11 Brian Grocock
2011/12 Michael Wildgust
2012/13 Leon Unczur
2013/14 Merlita Bryan
2014/15 Ian Malcolm 
2015/16 Jackie Morris
2016/17 Mohammed Saghir 
2017/18 Michael Edwards
2018/19 Liaqat Ali
2019/20 Rosemary Healy
2020/21 Rosemary Healy
2021/22 David Trimble
2022/23 Wendy Smith, (Lab)

See also
 Sheriff of Nottingham
 2007 Nottingham City Council election
 2011 Nottingham City Council election
 2015 Nottingham City Council election
 2019 Nottingham City Council election

References

External links
The Right Worshipful the Lord Mayor of Nottingham – Biography

Nottingham
Nottingham City Councillors
Mayors of Nottingham
Politics of Nottingham